The 1967 Tipperary Senior Hurling Championship was the 77th staging of the Tipperary Senior Hurling Championship since its establishment by the Tipperary County Board in 1887.

Carrick Davins were the defending champions.

On 29 October 1967, Carrick Davins won the championship after a 2-10 to 2-07 defeat of Roscrea in the final at Thurles Sportsfield. It was their second championship title overall and their second title in succession.

Results

Final

References

Tipperary
Tipperary Senior Hurling Championship